Kutlubulatovo (Qotlobulat) is a rural locality (a village) in Abitovsky Selsoviet, Meleuzovsky District, Bashkortostan, Russia. The population was 219 as of 2010. There is 1 street.

Geography 
Kutlubulatovo is located 26 km east of Meleuz (the district's administrative centre) by road. Basurmanovka is the nearest rural locality.

References 

Rural localities in Meleuzovsky District